Diego Armando Causado Rivero (born 17 June 1989) is a Colombian footballer who plays for Sucre FC in the Categoría Primera B, as a midfielder.

Club career

Sucre FC
On 1 April 2012, Diego featured in an away win to Depor FC in which he scored in the twenty-third minute.

References

External links
 
 
 
 

1989 births
Living people
Colombian footballers
Atlético Junior footballers
Boyacá Chicó F.C. footballers
Atlético La Sabana footballers
Association football midfielders
People from Sucre Department